Cirsium scariosum is a species of thistle known by the common names meadow thistle, elk thistle and dwarf thistle. It is native to much of western North America from Alberta and British Columbia, south to Baja California. There are also isolated populations on the Canadian Atlantic Coast, on the Mingan Archipelago in Québec, where it is called the Mingan thistle.

It was first published in Trans. Amer. Philos. Soc., ser.2, vol.7 on page 420 in 1841.

Description
Cirsium scariosum is a variable species growing in a variety of habitat types. It is made up of several geographic races, most of which have been previously classified as species. The races intergrade but their morphologies can also be quite different. This is generally a biennial or perennial herb. When there is a stem it is usually fleshy, ridged, and woolly in texture. The inflorescence holds several flower heads, each up to 4 centimeters long and 5 cm wide. The flower head is lined with phyllaries which may have spines and teeth and filled with white to purple disc florets but no ray florets. The fruit is a compressed achene a few millimetres long topped with a pappus which may be 3 centimeters in length.

Varieties
As accepted by Flora of North America;
Cirsium scariosum var. americanum - California, Colorado, Idaho, Nevada, Oregon, Utah, Wyoming, Baja California
Cirsium scariosum var. citrinum - California, Baja California 
Cirsium scariosum var. coloradense - Arizona, Colorado, New Mexico, Utah, Wyoming
Cirsium scariosum var. congdonii - California, Nevada
Cirsium scariosum var. robustum  - California, Oregon 
Cirsium scariosum var. scariosum - Quebec, Alberta, British Columbia, California, Colorado, Idaho, Montana, Oregon, Utah, Washington, Wyoming 
Cirsium scariosum var. thorneae - Utah, Nevada, Idaho, Colorado 
Cirsium scariosum var. toiyabense- Nevada, Oregon, Idaho

References

External links
Jepson Manual Treatment
Calphotos Photo gallery, University of California

scariosum
Plants described in 1841
Flora of North America
Taxa named by Thomas Nuttall